Ragnar Larsen (13 August 1931 – 19 October 1997) was a Norwegian footballer. He played in twelve matches for the Norway national football team from 1954 to 1959.

References

1931 births
1997 deaths
Norwegian footballers
Norway international footballers
Place of birth missing
Association footballers not categorized by position